The Ostfriedhof (Eastern Cemetery) in Munich, situated in the district of Obergiesing, was established in 1821 and is still in use. It contains an area of more than 30 hectares and approximately 34,700 burial plots.

The buildings were constructed between 1894 and 1900 to plans by Hans Grässel. In 1929 a crematorium was opened. The bodies of thousands of opponents of the National Socialist régime were cremated here in the years between 1933 and 1945, and their ashes mostly disposed of without memorial. These included people executed in Stadelheim Prison, victims of the concentration camps Dachau, Birkenau and Auschwitz, and of the Aktion T4 campaign. In 1946 the bodies of several of those condemned to death at the Nuremberg War Crimes trials including Hermann Göring were cremated here, and the ashes scattered.

History 

The oldest part of the Ostfriedhof was laid out in 1817 as the burial ground of Au on a narrow strip of the Auer Flur (on the present Tegernseer Landstraße) which extended into the territory of Giesing. After several extensions and the closure of the burial ground on Gietlstraße in 1876 it also became the burial ground of Giesing.

The cemetery building on St.-Martins-Platz was constructed between 1894 and 1900 to plans by Hans Grässel. A monumental cupola painting by Josef Guntermann was added at the same time (it was destroyed in World War II). At this time the Ostfriedhof was extended to form one of the great cemeteries of the then rapidly expanding city of Munich. A feature of the construction was the arcaded vaults built to form a courtyard surrounding rows of graves.

The old chapel of the Au burial ground was destroyed in World War II. The other buildings were badly damaged, but re-built by Hans Döllgast in 1951/52.

Crematorium 1929 

On 27 September 1929 the new crematorium was opened. The plain design was also by Grässel. For several days the crematorium was made accessible to public viewing, with the director of the city of Munich burial department leading the tours himself, despite criticism in the local press. There were altogether 27,000 visitors.

1933 to 1945 
Kurt Eisner, murdered on 21 February 1919, Minister-President of the short-lived Free State which preceded the Bavarian Soviet Republic, was buried in the Ostfriedhof. On 1 May 1922 the Free Trades Unions of Munich (Münchner Freien Gewerkschaften) commissioned a monument dedicated to "the Dead of the Revolution". The urn containing Eisner's ashes was walled into its pedestal. Shortly after the National Socialists took power the Monument to the Revolution was destroyed: it was demolished on 22 June 1933, and the urn with Eisner's ashes was moved to the New Jewish Cemetery, where it is still buried. The monument in the Ostfriedhof was re-created after the war by the artist Konstantin Frick as a faithful copy of the original.

In the crematorium of the Ostfriedhof the bodies of thousands of opponents of the Third Reich were incinerated. At the beginning of July 1934 the remains of 17 Nazis and opponents of National Socialism killed during the Night of the Long Knives were brought to the cemetery in a furniture van (to avoid attention) and burnt. The ashes were distributed at random among many urns, to remove all traces of the dead. Among these was the journalist Fritz Gerlich, held to be one of the most far-sighted and courageous enemies of Nazism.

An unknown number of people who were murdered for political reasons in Stadelheim Prison were cremated here, as were the bodies of 3,996 detainees from the concentration camps Dachau, Auschwitz and Buchenwald as well as from the liquidation facilities of the Aktion T4 euthanasia programme.

After 1945 

On 17 October 1946 US Army trucks brought 12 coffins, purporting to contain the bodies of 12 American soldiers who had died in a hospital and were to be cremated in the presence of American officers. One was empty, and was present only in order to mislead onlookers. In reality the bodies were those of ten Nazi war criminals condemned by the Nuremberg War Crimes Trials to be hanged: Joachim von Ribbentrop, Wilhelm Keitel, Ernst Kaltenbrunner, Alfred Rosenberg, Hans Frank, Wilhelm Frick, Julius Streicher, Fritz Sauckel, Alfred Jodl, and Arthur Seyss-Inquart. The eleventh body was that of Hermann Göring, who had committed suicide before his execution could take place. In order to prevent the graves later becoming centers of veneration, the ashes were scattered in the Isar.

Graves of notable persons 

 Carl Amery, writer
 Georg Brauchle, Bürgermeister of Munich
 Rudolf Brunnenmeier, footballer
 Géza von Cziffra, film director and screenwriter
 Anton Dunckern (1905–1985), SS General, lawyer
 Josef Eichheim, actor
 Franz Eisenhut (1857–1903), painter
 Kurt Eisner, politician (memorial; the remains were removed and the grave destroyed in 1933)
 Jörg Fauser (1944–1987), writer
 Rudolf Christoph Freiherr von Gersdorff, Major-General, member of the 20 July plot to assassinate Hitler
 Rex Gildo (Ludwig Hirtreiter), popstar
 Adolf Gondrell, conférencier, film and theatre actor
 Bernhard von Gudden, doctor and psychiatrist; died with his most famous patient, King Ludwig II of Bavaria
 Erich Hallhuber, Bavarian folk actor and dubber
 Friedrich Hollaender, composer
 Marie Louise von Wallersee, formerly Countess Larisch, niece of Empress Elisabeth of Austria (Sissi) 
 Adele Kern, opera singer
 Hilde Krahl, actress (memorial; she left her body to science)
 Peter Kreuder, composer
 Hans Leibelt, actor
 Klaus Löwitsch, actor
 Duke Ludwig Wilhelm in Bavaria (1831–1920)
 Martha Mödl, opera singer
 Rudolph Moshammer, Munich character, fashion designer and philanthropist
 Johann Rattenhuber, chief of Hitler's bodyguard
 Rudolf Rhomberg, actor
 Lothar Rohde, inventor, businessman (Rohde & Schwarz)
 Hjalmar Schacht, banker, Reichsminister of Economics and President of the Reichsbank
 Karl Scharnagl, Oberbürgermeister of Munich
 Julius Schaub, participant in the Beer Hall Putsch of 1923; Hitler's senior adjutant
 Sybille Schmitz, actress
 Rudolf Schündler, director, actor
 Joe Stöckel, actor and film director
 Barbara Valentin (Uschi Ledersteger), actress
 Carl Vezerfi-Clemm (1939–2012), sculptor, medallist, coin designer 
 Thomas Wimmer, Oberbürgermeister of Munich
 Wastl Witt, folk actor

Notes and references

Literature 
 Munich City Archives
 Benedikt Weyerer: München 1933–1949 – Stadtrundgänge zur politischen Geschichte. MünchenVerlag, München 2006, .
 Erich Scheibmayr: Letzte Heimat – Persönlichkeiten in Münchner Friedhöfen. MünchenVerlag, München 1985, .
 Erich Scheibmayr: Wer? Wann? Wo? 3 Teile. MünchenVerlag, München 1989, 1997, 2002, .
 Willibald Karl: Der Münchner Ostfriedhof – Von den „Auer Leichenäckern“ zum Großstadt-Krematorium. Zwei Rundgänge. MünchenVerlag, München 2011, .

External links 

 Munich City official website: Ostfriedhof - general information and link to cemetery plan 
 Münchner Friedhöfe: Ostfriedhof - graves of famous people 

Cemeteries in Munich
Crematoria in Germany